The Leeds city centre Loop Road was a one-way traffic route of approximately two miles within the city centre of Leeds, which encircled a large section of the shopping and retail district. It comprised the following eighteen junctions. It was finally removed as being a complete loop after Leeds City Council closed access to City Square in September 2022.

Junctions

 City Square
 Bank of England
 Town Hall
 Civic Hall
 Cathedral
 St. Johns
 Merrion
 Grand Theatre
 North Street
 Regent Street
 Eastgate
 Quarry Hill
 Crown Point
 Parish Church
 The Calls
 Bridge End
 Sovereign
 Bishopgate

External links
 http://www.openstreetmap.org/relation/4148004

Transport in Leeds
Roads in Leeds
Junctions
Junctions